Tin(II) oxalate is an inorganic compound, a salt of tin and oxalic acid with the chemical formula . The compound looks like colorless crystals, does not dissolve in water, and forms crystalline hydrates.

Synthesis
Effect of oxalic acid solution on tin(II) oxide :

Tin(II) oxalate can also be obtained by using tin(II) chloride and oxalic acid.

Properties
Tin (II) oxalate forms colorless crystals.

Insoluble in water and acetone. Soluble in dilute HCl, methanol, and petroleum ether.

Forms crystal hydrates of the composition SnCO•n HO, where n = 1 and 2.

Decomposes on heating:

Applications
Tin oxalate is used  as a catalyst in the production of organic esters and plasticizers.
It is used for dyeing and printing fabrics.
The compound is also used in stannous oral care compositions.
Few studies have reported on the use of tin(II) oxalate as an anode material for rechargeable lithium batteries.

References

Tin(II) compounds
Oxalates